Damian Militaru (born 19 December 1967) is a Romanian professional football coach and a former player. He is the technical director of Jiul Petroșani.

Honours
Steaua București
Divizia A (4): 1994–95, 1995–96, 1996–97, 1997–98
Cupa României (3): 1995–96, 1996–97, 1998–99
Supercupa României (3): 1994, 1995, 1998

References

External links

1967 births
Living people
People from Râmnicu Sărat
Romanian footballers
Liga I players
Liga II players
Liga III players
FC Shinnik Yaroslavl players
Russian Premier League players
FC Steaua București players
FC Dinamo București players
CSM Jiul Petroșani players
Association football midfielders
Romanian football managers
CSM Jiul Petroșani managers